Square Roots: The Story of SpongeBob SquarePants is a 2009 American documentary film directed and co-written by Patrick Creadon. The special was released on VH1 on July 14, 2009, and July 23, 2009, on Nick at Nite. It was also included on SpongeBob SquarePants: The First 100 Episodes DVD released in North America on September 22, 2009. The documentary chronicles the popular culture success of the animated television series SpongeBob SquarePants. It features commentaries from series creator Stephen Hillenburg and celebrity fans.

Synopsis
Square Roots: The Story of SpongeBob SquarePants focuses on the American animated television series SpongeBob SquarePants and its immersion into global popular culture. The film documents the show's early inspirations, and its origins. Among the millions of fans are celebrities such as LeBron James and Ricky Gervais, who express their insights for the show and its title character, SpongeBob. It also features the series' impact on the US President Barack Obama, the inmates of San Quentin State Prison, and fans around the world.

Cast

Alec Baldwin as himself
 Jerry Beck as himself
Ernest Borgnine as himself
Luke Brookshier as himself
Clancy Brown as himself
Rodger Bumpass as himself
Nate Cash as himself
Tim Conway as himself
Rosario Dawson as herself
Bill Fagerbakke as himself
Craig Ferguson as himself
Kristen Ridgway Flores as herself
Ricky Gervais as himself
David Hasselhoff as himself
Albie Hecht as himself
Stephen Hillenburg as himself
Derek Iversen as himself
LeBron James as himself
Jeffrey Katzenberg as himself
Tom Kenny as himself, Patchy the Pirate
Carolyn Lawrence as herself
Mr. Lawrence as himself
Scott Mansz as himself
Dani Michaeli as himself
Brian Doyle-Murray as himself
Keke Palmer as herself
Chris Pine as himself
Richard Pursel as himself
Nile Rodgers as himself
Andrea Romano as herself
Marion Ross as herself
Gene Shalit as himself
Alan Smart as himself
Steve Spruill as himself
Robert Thompson as himself
Paul Tibbitt as himself
Robert Smigel as Triumph the Insult Comic Dog
Nikki Vanzo as herself
Vincent Waller as himself
Ween as themselves

Archive footage

Katie Couric as herself
Jacques Cousteau as himself
Simon Cowell as himself
Whoopi Goldberg as herself
Barack Obama as himself
Jon Stewart as himself

Release
Square Roots: The Story of SpongeBob SquarePants was directed by Patrick Creadon. The documentary film originally aired on television on the cable network VH1 in the United States on July 14, 2009. It also aired on Nick at Nite on July 23, 2009, with a TV-PG parental rating. It was first announced in early 2009. On a press release, Viacom told:

Commissioned by Nickelodeon to commemorate the anniversary of the series' first episode, the documentary chronicles the beloved character's journey to international pop culture icon status and showcases the series' impact on everyone from President Barack Obama, kids across the globe and San Quentin inmates who readily sing its catchy theme song. The one-hour documentary, features an opening song from Avril Lavigne and commentary from creator Steve Hillenburg, cast and crew members, industry experts, fanatics and celebrities like LeBron James, Ricky Gervais and Rosario Dawson.

The documentary film was endorsed to mark the celebration of the series' 10th anniversary, following a SpongeBob marathon the next weekend. The anniversary was also celebrated with the premiere of the television film SpongeBob's Truth or Square and the special episode "To SquarePants or Not to SquarePants".

On September 22, 2009, the documentary appeared as a bonus feature on the DVD compilation SpongeBob SquarePants: The First 100 Episodes. The DVD consists 14 discs and runs 2200 minutes long. Other bonus features included in the DVD set are Limited edition etched Plexiglass case, Limited edition 3D lenticular, Audio Commentary from the Animation Team, Life Lessons from Bikini Bottom, "Help Wanted": The Seven Seas Edition, and Kick-Wham-Pow-Bob Music Video.

Reception
The documentary film received positive reviews. David Hinckley of the New York Daily News said that the "documentary's most interesting moments come from Hillenburg, who created SpongeBob as a secondary character in a comic before breaking him out on his own in July 1999." He added that "it's fun for the whole family." R.L. Shaffer of IGN wrote "what's here is still incredibly fun to pilfer though and a true delight for longtime fans." Gord Lacey of TV Shows on DVD called the film "the single-best feature that's appeared on a Nickelodeon DVD set." Michael Cavna of The Washington Post called it "some 'cult' to have."

Aaron H. Bynum of Animation Insider said that it "is essentially of two halves, the first of which is where the value lies. The first twenty minutes or so of the documentary is excellent; profiling Hillenburg and the writers, storyboard artists, and voice actors that have accompanied him on his journey." He added that the "remainder of the documentary is chiefly fluff."

References

External links

 
 Watch full video (region blocked)
 

2009 television films
2009 films
2009 in American television
Documentary films about television
Documentary films about animation
SpongeBob SquarePants
American documentary films
2000s American television specials
Films directed by Patrick Creadon
2000s American films